Mount Tabor High School is a high school located in Winston-Salem, North Carolina. It is part of the WS/FCS School System.

School demographics
During the 2010–2011 school year, there were 1,622 students enrolled at Mount Tabor. The racial makeup of the students was 48.8% White, 36.94% Black, 6.66% Hispanic, 4.5% Multiracial, 2.92% Asian/Pacific Islander, and 0.18% American Indian. 23% of students were eligible for free or reduced lunch.

History
Mount Tabor High School was opened as a 7–11 grade school at the beginning of the 1966–1967 school year. The following year the 12th Grade was added.  In 1971, the school district reorganized schools and changed Mount Tabor to a junior high school for grades 9 and 10. In 1984, it was changed again to a 9–12 grade high school. A new building containing a new auditorium, new guidance and administration offices, and several classrooms and science labs, was built in 2004.

On September 1, 2021, one student was fatally shot at the high school; after a manhunt, police apprehended the suspect the same day.

Athletics
Mount Tabor is a part of the North Carolina High School Athletic Association (NCHSAA) and is currently classified as a 4A school. It is a member of the Central Piedmont 4A conference.

Notable alumni
 Bekah Brunstetter  writer and producer
 Sam Cronin  MLS player
 Divine Deablo  NFL player
 Ed Gainey  Canadian football defensive back
 C. J. Harris  professional basketball player
 Cullen Moss  film, television, and voice actor
 A.J. Nicholson  NFL linebacker
 Derek Nicholson - NFL linebacker and NCAA football coach
 J-Mee Samuels  100m sprinter
 Stuart Scott  sportscaster and former ESPN SportsCenter anchor
 Ryan Taylor  NFL tight end
 Rolonda Watts  television personality and actress

References

External links
Mount Tabor High School Website
WS/FCS Website

High schools in Winston-Salem, North Carolina
Public high schools in North Carolina
Educational institutions established in 1966
1966 establishments in North Carolina